Chen Hung-ming is a Taiwanese campus folk singer, songwriter, and member of Little Crow from Penghu. His most famous song is "Forgotten Times".

Life

Folk style singer and songwriter 

Chen Hung-ming lived in Penghu up to age seven, when he moved to Taipei.

During his third year of high school, Chen and two of his classmates participated in  1978 first Folk Style competition at  store. 
They called themselves the Little Crow Trio, and they performed their original composition "Goodbye Clouds".

They ranked in the competition and thereafter gained recognition by Haishan Records and became a campus folk band. Little Crow recorded their songs into the Folk Style album series.

 They also provided backup vocals for Haishan Records artist Liu Chia-ling.

Chen’s works were also performed by other singers and included in the Folk Style series compilation albums. 
Several of his songs, including "Forgotten Times" and a song that is literally translated as "Morning Book", were recorded in the debut album Farewell My Country by Tsai Chin, who competed in the second Folk Style competition.

Later developments 

Chen graduated from the Radio and Television Division of what is now Shih Hsin University.
 
At this point he returned home looking for a stable job, and after being discharged from his military service, he joined the Taiwan Police College and served as a police officer. Because he was often assigned to handle jobs related to music, he realized that he desired to do music for a living and thereafter quit his police job.

In 1993, he joined with Pao Chih-ching to create the Little Crow and Wild Dove  duet, with whom he published one album.

In about 2006, with the encouragement of Lee Ming-yang, he started writing Taiwanese Hokkien songs. Since then, he has written at least 200 such songs.

After the movie Internal Affairs, which included his song "Forgotten Times," aired, the production company sent him a DVD of the film. 
Upon hearing his music, he reminisced on old times, and around 2010 he moved back to Penghu. 
There, he started a coffee shop and Judao Music Corporation,
and he resumed his musical activities.

In 2015, he wrote the song "Taiwan is Our Name" for the Kuomintang presidential nominee Hung Hsiu-chu.

The Song "Forgotten Times" 

When he was writing "Forgotten Times," Chen Hung-ming was only a high school junior. He was learning English at the time and reminiscing on his time living in Penghu as a young child. Because it seldom rained in Penghu, his happiest memory from childhood was hearing the sound of rain dripping on glass. It happened that at this time he had a guitar nearby, and he thereupon wrote this song. He originally planned to call the song "Who is Tapping on My Window".

After hearing Chen sing this song in the performance hall at the Folk Style competition, Tsai Chin expressed her interest in singing the song. She recorded this song in her 1980 personal album  Farewell My Country.

The 2002 film Infernal Affairs set off a craze for this song, and the French version of it was thereafter used in the 2008 film Flight of the Red Balloon by director Hou Hsiao-hsien.

Works 

 "Goodbye Clouds,"  which he recorded in 1978 into the Folk Style and for which he was the principal singer
 "Forgotten Time," which was recorded by Tsai Chin in 1980 in the album Farewell My Country
 "I Love you Taiwan", which was recorded by Chris Hung in the album Good Luck Man

See also 

 Campus folk song

Notes

References 

Taiwanese police officers
Year of birth missing (living people)
Living people
Taiwanese male singer-songwriters
People from Penghu County
Shih Hsin University alumni